USS Neshaminy was a large and powerful 3,850-ton screw frigate with a length of 335 feet that was under construction at the Philadelphia Navy Yard when she was surveyed by Navy officials who found her construction work to be poor. Construction was halted by the Navy, which eventually sold her for scrap.

Built in the Philadelphia Navy Yard
Neshaminy, a screw frigate built by the United States Navy during 1863–65 and launched 5 October 1865 at the Philadelphia Navy Yard, was a wooden ship of the first rate. She had two horizontal direct-acting engines of forty-eight-inch stroke and eight Martin boilers. Her machinery was built by the Etna Iron Works of New York.

The steamer was assigned a battery of two 100–pounder Parrott rifles, one 6–pounder rifle, ten 8-inch smoothbores, and four howitzers, but the battery was never mounted.

Construction problems
From 1866 through 1868 Neshaminy was at the New York Navy Yard for installation of her engines. In 1869 she was laid up in ordinary at that yard. Her name was changed to Arizona 15 May 1869, and to Nevada 12 August 1869.

In 1869 she was examined by a board which found her hull so twisted and her construction so poor that it was decided not to finish her. She remained in ordinary at New York City in an incomplete state until June 1874, when she was sold to John Roach for $25,000, in partial payment for rebuilding monitor .

See also

List of steam frigates of the United States Navy
Bibliography of American Civil War naval history
 United States Navy
 American Civil War

References

External links
 Photo gallery at Naval Historical Center

Sailing frigates of the United States Navy
Steamships of the United States Navy
Ships built in Philadelphia
Steam frigates
1865 ships